Einar Ferdinand "Einari" Aalto (27 May 1926 – 16 September 1985) was a Finnish swimmer. He competed in the men's 400 metre freestyle at the 1952 Summer Olympics.

References

External links
 

1926 births
1985 deaths
People from Hamina
Finnish male freestyle swimmers
Olympic swimmers of Finland
Swimmers at the 1952 Summer Olympics
Sportspeople from Kymenlaakso